Black John is a nickname.

It may refer to:

People
 "Black John" John Gotti (1940-2002), U.S. mobster
 "Black John" John MacCrimmon (died 1822), a bagpiper, member of the MacCrimmon (piping family)
 "Black John" (18th century), a court jester of the Arscotts of Tetcott

Fictional characters
 Black John Ambrose, a fictional character from the 1999 film Ride with the Devil (film)
 Black John, a character from the short story included with House of Gold & Bones – Part 2
 Black John, a character from the 1925 story Uncle Valentine
 Black John, a character from the 1928 film serial Tarzan the Mighty
 Black John, a character from the 1929 film serial Tarzan the Tiger
 Black John, a character from the 2016 short story "Cookie Jar"

See also

 "Black John" (song), a 2013 song by Stone Sour off the album House of Gold & Bones – Part 2
 Karajan (surname), literally "Black John"
 Black Jack (disambiguation)
 John Black (disambiguation)
 Jack Black (disambiguation)
 Black (disambiguation)
 John (disambiguation)